Ayatollah Seyyed Haj Muhammad-Hassan Jazayeri was from Khuzestan and he was a direct descendant of the Islamic prophet, Muhammad and was a descendant of Seyyed Nematollah Jazayeri who started the name Jazayeri 1640 (D.1700). Ayatollah Seyyed Haj Muhammad-Hassan Jazayeri was born in 1270 (1892) in the city of Qom, Iran. He started reading and studying the Quran at the age 5 as his father was a Grand Ayatollah Seyyed Mehdi. He learned several languages including Arabic and English by the age of 21. He was a teacher at a religious school called Elmia in Qom. He was a classmate of Ayatollah Khomeini when at quran school. At the age of 40, he was invited to Ahvaz to be the Supreme Religious leader of all the Imams of Khuzestan. He set the times of prayers (Aathaan) for Khuzestan. He had 5 children, 2 boys and 3 girls. He was very respected by the Shah of Iran. He led a very spiritual life and he was a very important Ayatollah in his time.

He died in 1343 (1965) at the age of 73.  He was buried in a tomb in Ahwaz (Khuzestan) and many mosques where named after him in Ahwaz and Shushtar and his ancestors. There is a newly built bridge named after him in Shushtar called the bridge of Ayatollah Jazayeri.

1892 births
1965 deaths
People from Khuzestan Province
Iranian ayatollahs
Al-Musawi Al-Jazayiri family